George Theophilus Robinson (20 May 1922- 7 February 2006) was a Creole civil servant and founder of the Creole Descendants Union (now the Krio Descendants Union or KDY) which was an offshoot of the Settlers Descendants Union.

Family background
George Robinson was a half-brother of Ephraim Jonathan Robinson (1894-1986) and was related to the Davis family (Sierra Leone). Robinson was a descendant of one of the founding Nova Scotian Settler families.

External links
http://www.slbtbhm.homestead.com/KDY.html

Sierra Leone Creole people
Sierra Leonean people of African-American descent
Sierra Leonean people of British descent
Krio Descendants Union
1922 births
2006 deaths